Rosters at the 2004 IIHF World Championship in the Czech Republic.

Canada

Sweden

United States

Czech Republic

Finland

Russia

Slovakia

References

 IIHF web site

rosters
IIHF World Championship rosters